David Soto Sánchez (born 16 October 1993) is a Spanish footballer who plays for Pontevedra CF as a centre-back.

Club career
Born in Ourense, Galicia, Soto played youth football with local Celta de Vigo. Still a junior, he and made his senior debuts with the reserves in the 2009–10 season, in Segunda División B.

On 4 June 2011 Soto appeared in his first game as a professional, starting in a 3–0 home win against FC Cartagena in the Segunda División championship. It was his only appearance with the main squad, however.

On 5 August 2015 Soto moved to another reserve team, UD Almería B also in the third tier. The following 13 July, he signed for CD Boiro.

Career statistics

Club

References

External links

1993 births
Living people
Spanish footballers
Footballers from Ourense
Association football defenders
Segunda División players
Segunda División B players
Tercera División players
Celta de Vigo B players
RC Celta de Vigo players
UD Almería B players
CD Boiro footballers
CCD Cerceda players
SD Compostela footballers
Pontevedra CF footballers